Giacomo Adolfi (1682–1741) was an Italian painter of the Baroque period, active in and around Bergamo.

Biography 
Giacomo Adolfi was born in Bergamo, the older brother of the painter Ciro Adolfi, and was initially taught by his father Benedetto Adolfi. He completed a number of fresco paintings in the churches and public buildings of Bergamo, including a Crowning of the Virgin for the church of Monastery del Paradiso and an Adoration of the Magi for Sant'Alessandro della Croce, Bergamo.

References

1682 births
1741 deaths
17th-century Italian painters
Italian male painters
18th-century Italian painters
Painters from Bergamo
Italian Baroque painters
18th-century Italian male artists